Dragon Booster is a Canadian animated series created by Rob Travalino and  Kevin Mowrer for the Canadian Broadcasting Corporation that aired from October 23, 2004 to December 23, 2006. The first series produced by Nerd Corps Entertainment, the series is about young Artha Penn, a stable boy. He is chosen by Beaucephalis (or "Beau" for short), the dragon of legend, to be his rider, turning him into the Dragon Booster, a hero to protect the world from the impending Dragon-Human war and unite humans and dragons for all time.

Plot
The story takes place on the world of Draconis, where 2000 years ago a huge Dragon-Human War erupted. The golden Dragon of Legend chose a human rider, the Dragon Booster, to bring peace and show that dragons and humans can coexist.

In the present day humans have been commanding dragons, the very thing the original Dragon Booster sought to prevent, and another war is looming. However, Connor Penn breeds back into existence one last gold dragon of legend, Beau. Beau chooses a stable boy, Artha Penn to be the Dragon Booster. Artha seeks to protect the world from the impending Dragon-Human war by defeating villains such as Moordryd Paynn and his father Word.

Episodes

Characters

Main

Artha Penn (Voiced by Matt Hill): Artha Tannis Penn is a 16 year old stable boy, a street racer, and the main protagonist of the series. After being chosen by Beau as his rider, he becomes the Dragon Booster, a hero sworn to protect the world from another Dragon-Human War. He is also the leader of his own racing team known as the Penn Racing Crew, and is the son of Connor and Fira Penn.

Lance Penn (Voiced by Kathleen Barr): Lance Patrick Penn is Artha's little brother, and a member of the Penn Racing Crew. He has a blue Energy-class dragon named Fracshun.

Parmon Sean (Voiced by Lee Tockar): Parmon is Artha's best friend and the technology geek as well as mechanic of the Penn Racing Crew. He also has advanced knowledge of just about everything. He has a Bull-class dragon named Cyranno.

Kitt Wonn (Voiced by Lenore Zann): The sole female member of the Penn Racing Crew, and a skilled racer. Artha is shown to have feelings for her, and likewise she is shown to have a crush on the Dragon Booster. She has a red Fire-class dragon named Wyldfyr.

Connor Penn (Voiced by Garry Chalk): Connor Penn was the owner of Penn Stables, father of Artha Penn and enemy of Word Paynn. For most of the series, Connor disguises himself as the character Mortis, a mentor of the Penn Racing Crew. He did this to allow Artha to develop on his own without relying on his father, as well as to watch over his two sons with no interference.

Beau: Beaucephalis is the Dragon of Legend and distantly related to the first Dragon of Legend who stopped the original Dragon-Human War. He is Artha's dragon partner. His Special Abilities include; Mag Shield, Furox Form, Five Draconium Colors of Balance Mag Manipulation, and Black Draconium Use.

Antagonists

Word Paynn (Voiced by Mark Oliver): The father of Moordryd Paynn and the main antagonist of the series. His main goal is to start another Dragon-Human War, confident that he can control the war and whatever benefits it can give to him. He owns Paynn Inc., a company that manufactures cutting edge racing and battling gear. Throughout the first half of the series, his plans tend to revolve around stealing the dragon of legend, Beau. He is later revealed to be Drakkus, a warrior with ancient armor from 3000 years ago, and rides a pure black dragon named Abandonn.

Moordryd Paynn (Voiced by Trevor Devall): The 16 year old leader of the Dragon Eye Crew and son of Word Paynn. Moordryd starts as one of the main antagonists of the series and the primary enemy of Artha Penn. However, as the series progresses he is shown to have heroic qualities within him, and develops into a more complex anti-hero. Later under the guidance of Armeggadon, Moordryd finds a black draconium gauntlet and becomes the Shadow Booster, possessing power rivaling that of the Dragon Booster. He rides a black dragon named Decepshun.

Armeggaddon (Voiced by Gerad Plunkett): 3000 years ago, He was an enemy to the original Dragon Booster and helped start the original Dragon-Human War. He was imprisoned in The Shadow Track by the original Shadow Booster until Artha and Moordryd broke the spell. Armeggaddon mentors Moordryd, who becomes the Shadow Booster.

Cain (Voiced by Scott McNeil): Moordryd Paynn's key lieutenant as well as his closest friend.

Recurring characters

Phistus: The leader of the Grip of the Dragon crew as well as the Down City Council of Twelve. He is also the all-time Dragon City jousting champion. He rides the green Bull-class dragon Brutaris.

Pyrrah: A street racer and the leader of the Dragon Flares Crew. She is Sparkk's elder sister and rides the red Magma-class dragon Phorrj.

Khatah: The leader of The Inner Order Crew. He and his crew are former world champions of the Horn of Libris Tournament before they were defeated (with a bit of cheating) by Moordryd and Cain. He rides the blue Energy-class dragon Shock-Ra.

Captain Faier: The new head of Dragon City Security headquartered at Precinct. He rides the blue Energy-class dragon Cuffs.

Stewardd: The short, reclusive leader of the Dragon Keepers crew.

Propheci: The true leader of the Prophets Crew, an orange Control-class dragon. His human rider was Reepyr, who along with his fellow riders submitted to the control of their dragons. Propheci wants the Dragon Booster destroyed to prevent humans from controlling dragons.

Chute: The Academy's top cadet student and the leader of the Dragon Winds Crew. She has a white dragon called Turbulence.

Sentrus: The Academy scout who shows interest in Artha Penn and Moordryd Paynn.

Cancellation
The end of the final episode of the third season alluded to a planned name change to Dragon Booster: Academy for the next season. However, in an interview with Matt Hill (the voice of Artha Penn) on June 10, 2006, at the Otakuthon convention held in Concordia University, it was made apparent that Dragon Booster failed to pull together a large enough fan base and production has permanently ceased on the series. He stated, "We did not get the following 13 episodes." When asked why the series lost its bid for more episodes, Hill responded, "They were not selling enough action figures".

References

External links
Dragon Booster at Internet Movie Database (IMDB)
Dragon Booster Fan Site
Dragon Booster Fan Forum

2000s Canadian animated television series
2004 Canadian television series debuts
2006 Canadian television series endings
English-language television shows
Animated television series about dragons
Jetix original programming
CBC Television original programming
Canadian computer-animated television series
Television series by Alliance Atlantis
Television series by DHX Media
Canadian children's animated action television series
Canadian children's animated adventure television series
Canadian children's animated science fantasy television series
Anime-influenced Western animated television series
Television shows filmed in Vancouver
Canadian Screen Award-winning television shows